The following list of known freshwater fish species, subspecies, and hybrids occurring in Washington state is taken from Wydoski and Whitney(2003).  Some scientific names have been updated or corrected. Trout nomenclature follows Behnke et al.(2002). Asterisks denote introduced fishes. The list includes several anadromous species, and two normally marine species (starry flounder and shiner perch) that are occasionally found in freshwater. Only one species (Olympic mudminnow) is a Washington endemic, however three others (Nooksack dace, Salish sucker, and margined sculpin) have very limited distributions outside the state. Sixty-seven fish species, subspecies, or hybrids are listed, 37 native, and 30 introduced.

Petromyzontiformes

Family Petromyzontidae
Pacific lamprey, Entosphenus tridentatus
Western river lamprey, Lampetra ayresi
Western brook lamprey, Lampetra  richardsoni

Acipenseriformes

Family Acipenseridae
Green sturgeon, Acipenser medirostris
White sturgeon, Acipenser transmontanus

Clupeiformes

Family Clupeidae
American shad*, Dorosoma sapidissima

Cypriniformes

Family Catostomidae
Longnose sucker, Catostomus catostomus
Salish sucker, Catostomus sp.
Bridgelip sucker, Catostomus columbianus
Largescale sucker, Catostomus macrocheilus
Mountain sucker, Catostomus platyrhynchus

Family Cobitidae
Weatherfish*, Misgurnus anguillicaudatus

Family Cyprinidae
Chiselmouth, Acrocheilus alutaceus
Goldfish*, Carassius auratus
Lake chub, Couseius plumbeus
Grass carp*, Ctenopharyngodon idella
Common carp*, Cyprinus carpio
Tui chub, Gila bicolor
Peamouth, Mylocheilus caurinus
Golden shiner*, Notemigonus crysoleucas
Fathead minnow*, Pimephales promelas
Northern pikeminnow, Ptychocheilus oregonensis
Longnose dace, Rhinichthys cataractae
Nooksack dace, Rhinichthys cataractae ssp.
Leopard dace, Rhinichthys falcatus
Umatilla dace, Rhinichthys umatilla
Speckled dace, Rhinichthys osculus
Redside shiner, Richardsonius balteatus
Tench*, Tinca tinca

Cyprinodontiformes

Family Fundulidae
Banded killifish*, Fundulus diaphanus

Family Poeciliidae
Mosquitofish, Gambusia affinis

Esociformes

Family Esocidae
Grass pickerel*,Esox americanus vermiculatus
Northern pike*, Esox lucius
Tiger muskellunge*, E. lucius x E. masquinongy hybrid

Olympic mudminnow, Novumbra hubbsi

Perciformes

Family Centrarchidae
Rock bass*, Ambloplites rupestris
Green sunfish*, Lepomis cyanellus
Bluegill*, Lepomis macrochirus
Pumpkinseed*, Lepomis gibbosus
Warmouth*, Lepomis gulosus
Smallmouth bass*, Micropterus dolomieui
Largemouth bass*, Micropterus salmoides
White crappie*, Pomoxis annularis
Black crappie*, Pomoxis nigromaculatus

Family Embiotocidae
Shiner perch, Cymatogaster aggregata

Family Percidae
Yellow perch*, Perca flavescens
Walleye*, Sander vitreus

Family Percichthyidae
Striped bass*, Morone saxatilis

Percopsiformes

Family Percopsidae
Sand roller, Percopsis transmontanus

Gadiformes

Family Gadidae
Burbot, Lota lota

Gasterosteiformes

Family Gasterosteidae
Three-spine stickleback, Gasterosteus aculeatus
Brook stickleback*, Culaea inconstans

Osmeriformes

Family Osmeridae
Longfin smelt, Spirinchus thaleichthys
Eulachon, Thaleichthys pacificus

Pleuronectiformes

Family Pleuronectidae
Starry flounder, Planichthys stellatus

Salmoniformes

Family Salmonidae
Lake whitefish*, Coregonus clupeaformis
Chinook salmon, Oncorhynchus tshawytscha
Coho salmon, Oncorhynchus kisutch
Chum salmon, Oncorhynchus keta
Sockeye salmon/Kokanee, Oncorhynchus nerka
Pink salmon, Oncorhynchus gorbuscha
Golden trout*, Oncorhynchus mykiss aguabonita
Coastal rainbow trout/Steelhead, Oncorhynchus mykiss irideus
Columbia River redband trout, Oncorhynchus mykiss gairdneri
Coastal cutthroat trout, Oncorhynchus clarki clarki
Westslope cutthroat trout, Oncorhynchus clarki lewisi
Lahontan cutthroat trout*, Oncorhynchus clarki henshawi
Pygmy whitefish, Prosopium coulteri
Mountain whitefish, Prosopium williamsoni
Atlantic salmon*, Salmo salar
Brown trout*, Salmo trutta
Bull trout, Salvelinus confluentus
Brook trout*, Salvelinus fontinalis
Dolly Varden, Salvelinus malma
Lake trout*, Salvelinus namaycush
Arctic grayling*, Thymallus arcticus

Scorpaeniformes

Family Cottidae
Coastrange sculpin, Cottus aleuticus
Prickly sculpin, Cottus asper
Mottled sculpin, Cottus bairdi
Paiute sculpin, Cottus beldingi
Slimy sculpin, Cottus cognatus
Shorthead sculpin, Cottus confusus
Riffle sculpin, Cottus gulosus
Reticulate sculpin, Cottus perplexus
Margined sculpin, Cottus marginatus
Torrent sculpin, Cottus rhotheus
Pacific staghorn sculpin, Leptocottus armatus

Siluriformes

Family Ictaluridae
Black bullhead*, Ameiurus melas
Yellow bullhead*, Ameiurus natalis
Brown bullhead*, Ameiurus nebulosus
Channel catfish*, Ictalurus punctatus
Tadpole madtom*, Noturus gyrinus
Flathead catfish*, Pylodictis olivaris

References

External links
 Aquatic Species at Risk - Nooksack Dace | Fisheries and Oceans Canada
 Updated COSEWIC status report on Nooksack dace
 Washington Department of Fish and Wildlife Endangered Fish Species page
 FishBase
 Integrated Taxonomic Information System
 Paper on Nooksack dace and Salish sucker

Fish
Washington state
.Washington
.Washington